Pugu is a Tanzanian town close to Kisarawe, about 20 km south-west of Dar es Salaam. It is formally an administrative ward of the Ilala District, in the Dar es Salaam Region. At the 2002 census, the ward had a total population of 14,652.

Pugu is located in a hilly region called the Pugu Hills. The local population is mostly from the Zaramo ethnic group, with a smaller percentage of Makonde people. The village has a large agriculture cattle market, a school, and a mission. A historical cemetery commemorates the German missionaries that were killed here in the 19th century.

References

See also
 Pugu Hills Forest Reserve

Ilala District
Wards of Dar es Salaam Region